Altar is a collaboration album between experimental music groups Boris and Sunn O))), released on October 31, 2006 through Southern Lord Records (SUNN62). A limited two-CD edition was released on October 23 via Southern Lord with a 28-minute bonus track with Sunn O))), Boris, and Dylan Carlson, titled "Her Lips Were Wet with Venom". Inoxia Records released their own two-CD version in 2006 which features a bonus track on the first disc, "The Sinking Belle (Black Sheep)", and also features "Her Lips Were Wet with Venom" on disc 2. The triple-vinyl edition by Southern Lord contains all of the songs from their two-CD edition, additional pictures, and liner notes by Kim Thayil. The Daymare 3LP version was released March 23, 2007 and features a bonus track not found on any other version of this release: "The Sinking Belle (White Sheep)".

In addition to major players Sunn O))) and Boris, Altar also boasts an extensive roster of guest musicians/collaborators such as Kim Thayil (Soundgarden), Joe Preston (Earth, Thrones, Melvins, High on Fire), Phil Wandscher and Jesse Sykes (both of Jesse Sykes and the Sweet Hereafter) as well as long time Sunn O))) collaborators TOS Niewenhuizen and Rex Ritter.

On December 10, 2007, the bands collaborated at the Forum in London 
along with a number of the guests featured on Altar for a live performance. A 3LP picture disc version of the album, limited to 500 
copies, was sold exclusively at this London show.

Track listing

Disc One
 "Etna" – 9:51
 "N.L.T." – 3:49
 "The Sinking Belle (Blue Sheep)" – 7:37
 "Akuma no Kuma" – 7:52
 "Fried Eagle Mind" – 9:47
 "The Sinking Belle (Black Sheep)" - 5:05 (Japanese CD bonus track)
 "The Sinking Belle (White Sheep)" - 4:36 (Japanese 3LP bonus track)
 "Blood Swamp" – 14:46

Disc Two
 "Her Lips Were Wet With Venom" – 28:14

Personnel
Sunn O))) & Boris
 Greg Anderson - guitar , bass guitar , bass , Moog Rogue 
 Stephen O'Malley - guitar , piano , Korg MS-20 , clandestine guitar , califone 
 Wata - lead guitar , guitar , space echo , vocals & space guitar , space echo guitar 
 Takeshi - guitar , bass , bottle lead guitar 
 Atsuo - drums , bowed cymbal , gong , traps , lead drums 

Additional musicians
 Bill Herzog - upright bass , vocals , snare 
 Jesse Sykes - vocals 
 Phil Wandscher - vocals 
 Adrienne Davies - percussion 
 Joe Preston - vocoder 
 Steve Moore - trombone 
 TOS Nieuwenhuizen - oberheim , Moog Taurus , Moog Rogue , Korg MS-20 
 Troy Swanson - oberheim , oberheim 4 voice 
 Randall Dunn - Korg MS-20 , sherman filter bank , echoplex , natural trouble 
 Mell Dettmer - Roland SH-101 
 Eyvind Kang - viola, violin 
 Kim Thayil - guitar 
 Rex Ritter - Moog Taurus 
 Dylan Carlson - guitar 

Technical
Produced By Sunn O)))
Recorded, Engineered & Mixed By Randall Dunn
Mastered By Mell Dettmer

Pressing History

Notes and references

Sunn O))) albums
Boris (band) albums
2006 albums
Southern Lord Records albums
Collaborative albums